David A. Brandemuehl (December 7, 1931 – September 26, 2006) was a member of the Wisconsin State Assembly.

Biography
Brandemuehl was born on December 7, 1931, in Mount Hope, Wisconsin. Later, he moved with his family to Fennimore, Wisconsin. After graduating from high school, he attended the University of Wisconsin–Madison. During the Korean War, Brandemuehl served in the United States Air Force.

In 1958, Brandemuehl married Elizabeth Cretney. They had four children. Elizabeth died in 1997. In 2004, Brandemuehl married LaRue Oetker. Brandemuehl died on September 26, 2006.

Career
Brandemuehl was first elected to the Assembly in 1986 and remained a member until 2001. Additionally, he was a member of the Fennimore Community School Board from 1967 to 1987. Brandemuehl was a Republican.

References

External links
 

1931 births
2006 deaths
20th-century American politicians
People from Mount Hope, Wisconsin
Republican Party members of the Wisconsin State Assembly
School board members in Wisconsin
Military personnel from Wisconsin
United States Air Force personnel of the Korean War
United States Air Force airmen
University of Wisconsin–Madison alumni
People from Fennimore, Wisconsin